Chedgrave is a village and civil parish in English county of Norfolk. Chedgrave is separated from nearby Loddon by the River Chet.

History
Chedgrave's name is of Anglo-Saxon origin and likely derives from the Old English for Ceatta's pit or grove.

In the Domesday Book, Chedgrave is described as consisting of 73 households located in the hundred of Loddon. The village formed part of the estates of Ralph Baynard.

Geography
According to the 2011 Census, Chedgrave has 1,051 residents living in 488 households.

Chedgrave falls within the constituency of South Norfolk and is represented at Parliament by Richard Bacon MP of the Conservative Party.

War Memorial
Chedgrave's war memorials take the form of two marble plaques inside All Saints' Church as well as a lychgate erected in 2018. The memorial lists the following name for the First World War:
 Gunner Edward G. H. Beckham (1880-1917), 228th (Siege) Battery, Royal Garrison Artillery
 Private Free Easter (d.1917), 1/9th Battalion, Durham Light Infantry
 Private James J. Fuller (1897-1917), 4th Battalion, Yorkshire Regiment

And, the following for the Second World War:
 Gunner-Second-Class Robert R. Goulty (1924-1943), Royal Air Force
 Private Stanley D. Goodyear (1926-1944), 4th Battalion, Dorsetshire Regiment
 Private Harry A. Seamons (1922-1942), 4th Battalion, Royal Norfolk Regiment
 Private Albert E. H. Starman (1919-1944), 4th Battalion, Royal Norfolk Regiment

References

External links

Villages in Norfolk
Civil parishes in Norfolk